Iowa's 7th congressional district is a former congressional district in Iowa. It was eliminated after the 1970 election, leaving Iowa with six congressional districts. The state has since been reduced to four congressional districts.

Redistricting
The 7th District was reformed for the 1932 election and Iowa dropped its 10th and 11th districts.  Cassius C. Dowell ran for and won the 6th Congressional District, while Otha D. Wearin took over the 7th Congressional District. The district was eliminated as a result of the 1970 census. All of the district was then put in the 5th congressional district, with the exception of Crawford and Monona counties which were put in the 6th district.

List of members representing the district

Election history

See also
 List of United States representatives from Iowa
 Iowa's congressional districts

References

 Congressional Biographical Directory of the United States 1774–present

06
Former congressional districts of the United States
1873 establishments in Iowa
1973 disestablishments in Iowa